A depauperate ecosystem is an ecosystem which is lacking in numbers or variety of species, often because it lacks enough stored chemical elements and resources required for life. Thus, depauperate ecosystems often cannot support rapid growth of flora and fauna, high biomass density, and high biological diversity. An urchin barren is an example of a depauperate ecosystem.

As it is a biological community of interacting organisms and their physical environment, when such ecosystem is depauperate, it means that the area is poor in ecological resources, both in quantity and diversity. An example of a depauperate environment is Muirfield Seamount.

References

Further reading
Schluter, Dolph. The Ecology of Adaptive Radiation. Oxford: Oxford UP, 2000. Print.
Strier, Karen B. Primate Behavioral Ecology. Boston: Allyn and Bacon, 2000. Print.

Ecosystems
Ecology terminology
Habitat